Ukraine Recovery Conference (URC2022) was a two-day international conference held on 4–5 July 2022 in Lugano, Switzerland designed to present the Ukrainian roadmap on the post-war reconstruction of Ukraine, as well as to discuss plans and raise funds for the reconstruction of Ukraine. It has been called a “Marshall Plan” for Ukraine. The Cabinet of Ministers of Ukraine estimated the cost of postwar reconstruction of Ukraine at $750 billion with level of GDP growth at 7%.

The conference was originally planned as the 5th Ukraine Reform Conference, but its focus and name were shifted due to the Russian invasion of Ukraine.

Participants 
Dozens of high-rank politicians from around the world are participating in the conference, including Prime Minister of Ukraine Denys Shmyhal, European Commission President Ursula von der Leyen, and Ukrainian President Volodymyr Zelenskyy (virtually).

General information 
Great Britain unveiled a large aid package for the rebuilding of Ukraine.

The 2023 conference on Recovery of Ukraine is expected to be hosted by the United Kingdom.

The Declaration of Lugano on Ukraine was signed by heads of state and government, ministers and high representatives of Albania, Australia, Austria, Belgium, Greece, Denmark, Estonia, Israel, Ireland, Iceland, Spain, Italy, Canada, Cyprus, Latvia, Lithuania, Liechtenstein, Luxembourg, Malta, Moldova, the Netherlands, Germany, Norway, North Macedonia, Poland, Portugal, South Korea, Romania, Slovakia, Slovenia, the United Kingdom, the United States, Turkey, Ukraine, Hungary, Finland, France, Croatia, Japan, as well as senior officials and high representatives of the Council of Europe, the European Bank for Reconstruction and Development, the European Commission, the European Investment Bank, and the Organization for Economic Cooperation and Development.

Statements 
During his speech on July 4 Zelenskyy asked some Ukrainians to return to Ukraine: "I would like to invite some people whom I saw through the screen, I have not seen them all these months of the war, I would also like to invite them to Ukraine. Because we have restoration in Ukraine, restoration of our state. I just wanted to remind them of that. Because the war in Ukraine is where these people work. I think I hinted very subtly". Concerning Russia, Zelenskyy stated: "Russia's war against Ukraine is not only an attempt to seize our land and destroy state institutions, break our independence. This is a worldview confrontation. The anti-democratic and anti-European system built in Russia is trying to prove that it is supposedly stronger than all of us. and Ukraine, and Europe, and the democratic world".

The President of the Swiss Confederation, Ignazio Cassis, said during his speech: "What unites us is the desire in this time of horror, devastation and grief to give Ukrainians the prospect of returning to an independent life, to peace and a bright future. The road ahead is long, but it is never too late to prepare for the time when the guns fall silent".

References 

Reactions to the 2022 Russian invasion of Ukraine
Economic history of Ukraine
Development in Europe
Volodymyr Zelenskyy
Events in Lugano
Diplomatic conferences
21st-century diplomatic conferences (Europe)
Diplomatic conferences in Switzerland
2022 in Switzerland